C. brachyurus may refer to:

Camaroptera brachyura, the green-backed camaroptera, a bird species
Carcharhinus brachyurus, the copper shark, a shark species
Chrysocyon brachyurus, the maned wolf, a canid species

Synonyms
Celeus brachyurus, a synonym for Micropternus brachyurus, the rufous woodpecker, a bird species